This is a list of members of the crane fly genus Tipula.

Acutipula
Subgenus Acutipula Alexander, 1924

T. acanthophora Alexander, 1934
T. aktashi Koc, Hasbenli & de Jong, 1998
T. alboplagiata Alexander, 1935
T. alphaspis Speiser, 1909
T. amissa Alexander, 1960
T. amymona Alexander, 1951
T. amytis Alexander, 1933
T. angolana Alexander, 1963
T. anormalipennis Pierre, 1924
T. apicidenticulata Yang & Yang, 1995
T. atuntzuensis Edwards, 1928
T. aureola Mannheims, 1952
T. auspicis Alexander, 1950
T. bakundu de Jong, 1984
T. balcanica Vermoolen, 1983
T. bamileke de Jong, 1984
T. bantu Alexander, 1956
T. barbigera Young and Li, 2013
T. bartletti Alexander, 1920
T. basispinosa Alexander, 1970
T. bicompressa Alexander, 1950
T. bihastata Alexander, 1941
T. bioculata Alexander, 1960
T. bipenicillata Alexander, 1924
T. biramosa Alexander, 1933
T. bistripunctata (Speiser, 1909)
T. bistyligera Alexander, 1935
T. bosnica Strobl, 1898
T. brunnirostris Edwards, 1928
T. bubiana de Jong, 1984
T. bubo Alexander, 1918
T. buboda Yang & Yang, 1992
T. bulbifera Alexander, 1953
T. calcar (Alexander, 1958)
T. camerounensis Alexander, 1921
T. captiosa Alexander, 1936
T. centroproducta Alexander, 1972
T. chaniae Alexander, 1956
T. cinnamomea Riedel, 1914
T. citae Oosterbroek & Vermoolen, 1990
T. cockerelliana Alexander, 1925
T. coeana Alexander, 1966
T. corsica Pierre, 1921
T. cranicornuta Yang & Yang, 1992
T. cretensis Vermoolen, 1983
T. cypriensis Vermoolen, 1983
T. dahomiensis Alexander, 1920
T. desidiosa Alexander, 1933
T. deva Alexander, 1952
T. dichroa Bezzi, 1906
T. dicladura Alexander, 1934
T. diclava Alexander, 1922
T. doriae Pierre, 1926
T. echo Alexander, 1961
T. ellenbergeri Alexander, 1920
T. ellioti Alexander, 1920
T. epicaste Alexander, 1952
T. epularis Alexander, 1953
T. forticauda Alexander, 1936
T. fulani Alexander, 1975
T. fulvipennis De Geer, 1776
T. fumicosta Brunetti, 1918
T. fumivena (Alexander, 1958)
T. furcifera Young and Li, 2013
T. furvimarginata Yang & Yang, 1992
T. gaboonensis Alexander, 1920
T. gansuensis Yang & Yang, 1995
T. gemma Alexander, 1953
T. globicauda Alexander, 1960
T. gola Alexander, 1958
T. grahamiana Alexander, 1964
T. graphiptera Alexander, 1933
T. guizhouensis Yang, Gao & Young, 2006
T. hardeana Alexander, 1978
T. hemmingseniana Alexander, 1961
T. henanensis Li and Yang, 2010
T. hokusaii de Jong, 1984
T. hova Alexander, 1920
T. hubeiana Yang & Yang, 1992
T. incorrupta Alexander, 1933
T. indra Alexander, 1961
T. intacta Alexander, 1933
T. interrupta Brunetti, 1911
T. irrequieta Alexander, 1936
T. ismene Mannheims, 1969
T. isparta Vermoolen, 1983
T. iyala Alexander, 1974
T. jacobsoni Edwards, 1919
T. jocosa Alexander, 1917
T. kenia Alexander, 1920
T. kinangopensis (Riedel, 1914)
T. kumpa Alexander, 1961
T. kuzuensis Alexander, 1918
T. lambertoniana Alexander, 1955
T. langi Alexander, 1920
T. latifasciata Alexander, 1933
T. latifurca Vermoolen, 1983
T. leonensis Alexander, 1920
T. leptoneura Alexander, 1922
T. levicula Alexander, 1972
T. lhabu Alexander, 1970
T. libanica Vermoolen, 1983
T. lieftinckiana Alexander, 1944
T. linneana Alexander, 1966
T. longispina Yang, Gao & Young, 2006
T. loveridgei Alexander, 1972
T. luctuosa Mannheims, 1964
T. luna Westhoff, 1879
T. luteinotalis Alexander, 1941
T. macra Savchenko, 1961
T. mannheimsiana Alexander, 1953
T. masai Alexander, 1920
T. maxima Poda, 1761
T. medivittata Yang & Yang, 1995
T. megaleuca Alexander, 1933
T. melampodia Alexander, 1935
T. meliuscula Alexander, 1920
T. milanjensis Alexander, 1920
T. milanjii Alexander, 1920
T. mogul Alexander, 1970
T. mungo de Jong, 1984
T. natalia Alexander, 1956
T. neavei Alexander, 1920
T. nevada Dufour, 1990
T. niethammeri Mannheims, 1969
T. nigroantennata Savchenko, 1961
T. nyasae Alexander, 1920
T. obex Alexander, 1960
T. obtusiloba Alexander, 1934
T. octoplagiata Alexander, 1951
T. omeiensis Alexander, 1934
T. oncerodes Alexander, 1933
T. oryx Alexander, 1921
T. paria Speiser, 1909
T. persegnis Alexander, 1945
T. pertinax Alexander, 1936
T. phaeocera Alexander, 1958
T. phaeoleuca Alexander, 1940
T. platycantha Alexander, 1934
T. pomposa Bergroth, 1888
T. princeps Brunetti, 1912
T. pseudacanthophora Yang & Yang, 1993
T. pseudocockerelliana Yang & Yang, 1995
T. pseudofulvipennis de Meijere, 1919
T. punctoargentea Alexander, 1960
T. quadrifulva Edwards, 1921
T. quadrinotata Brunetti, 1912
T. radha Alexander, 1952
T. receptor Alexander, 1941
T. repanda Loew, 1864
T. repentina Mannheims, 1952
T. rifensis Theowald & Oosterbroek, 1980
T. robusta Brunetti, 1911
T. ruwenzori Alexander, 1920
T. saitamae Alexander, 1920
T. schizostyla Alexander, 1956
T. schmidti Mannheims, 1952
T. schulteni Theowald, 1983
T. sichuanensis Yang & Yang, 1991
T. sicula Alexander, 1961
T. silinda Alexander, 1920
T. sinarctica Yang & Yang, 1993
T. sircari Alexander, 1953
T. sjostedti Alexander, 1924
T. sogana Alexander, 1965
T. stenacantha Alexander, 1937
T. stenoterga Alexander, 1941
T. subintacta Alexander, 1936
T. subturbida Alexander, 1933
T. subvernalis Alexander, 1927
T. takahashii Alexander, 1971
T. tananarivia Alexander, 1960
T. tenuicornis Schummel, 1833
T. tigon Alexander, 1976
T. tokionis Alexander, 1920
T. transcaucasica Savchenko, 1961
T. triangulifera Loew, 1864
T. triplaca Alexander, 1961
T. triscopula Alexander, 1970
T. turbida Alexander, 1924
T. uluguruensis Alexander, 1962
T. umbrinoides Alexander, 1915
T. urundiana Alexander, 1955
T. vadoni Alexander, 1955
T. vana Alexander, 1934
T. vanewrighti Oosterbroek, 1986
T. vanstraeleni Alexander, 1956
T. velutina Walker, 1848
T. victoria Alexander, 1920
T. vittata Meigen, 1804
T. yoruba Alexander, 1976
T. yunnanica Edwards, 1928
T. zambeziensis Alexander, 1917
T. zhaojuensis Yang & Yang, 1991
T. zuluensis Alexander, 1956

Afrotipula

Subgenus Afrotipula Alexander, 1955
T. aethiopica Alexander, 1972
T. brachycera Riedel, 1914
T. infracta Alexander, 1955

Arctotipula
Subgenus Arctotipula Alexander, 1934

T. aleutica Alexander, 1923
T. bakeriana Alexander, 1954
T. besselsi Osten Sacken, 1877
T. besselsoides Alexander, 1919
T. caliginosa Savchenko, 1961
T. centrodentata Alexander, 1953
T. conjuncta Alexander, 1925
T. crassispina Savchenko, 1978
T. denali Alexander, 1969
T. dickinsoni Alexander, 1932
T. excelsa Savchenko, 1961
T. gavronskii Alexander, 1934
T. hirticula Alexander, 1953
T. hirtitergata Alexander, 1934
T. hovsgolensis Gelhaus, Podenas & Brodo, 2000
T. kincaidi Alexander, 1949
T. laterodentata Alexander, 1950
T. loganensis Alexander, 1946
T. mckinleyana Alexander, 1969
T. miyadii Alexander, 1935
T. namhaidorji Gelhaus, Podenas & Brodo, 2000
T. oklandi Alexander, 1922
T. piliceps Alexander, 1915
T. plutonis Alexander, 1919
T. pudibunda Savchenko, 1961
T. quadriloba Savchenko, 1967
T. rubicunda Savchenko, 1961
T. sacra Alexander, 1946
T. salicetorum Siebke, 1870
T. semidea Alexander, 1944
T. smithae Alexander, 1968
T. suttoni Alexander, 1934
T. tribulator Alexander, 1956
T. twogwoteeana Alexander, 1945
T. williamsiana Alexander, 1940

Bellardina

Subgenus Bellardina Edwards, 1931
T. albimacula Doane, 1912
T. craverii Bellardi, 1859
T. cydippe Alexander, 1947
T. edwardsi Bellardi, 1859
T. flinti Alexander, 1970
T. fuscolimbata Alexander, 1981
T. larga Alexander, 1946
T. obliquefasciata Macquart, 1846
T. parrai Alexander, 1940
T. praelauta Alexander, 1949
T. pura Alexander, 1941
T. rupicola Doane, 1912
T. schizomera Alexander, 1940
T. theobromina Edwards, 1920
T. wetmoreana Alexander, 1947

Beringotipula

Subgenus Beringotipula Savchenko, 1961
T. afflicta Dietz, 1915
T. appendiculata Loew, 1863
T. athabasca Alexander, 1927
T. borealis Walker, 1848
T. charpalex Byers & Arnaud, 2001
T. clathrata Dietz, 1914
T. coloradensis Doane, 1911
T. comstockiana Alexander, 1947
T. donaldi Alexander, 1965
T. dorothea Alexander, 1954
T. fallax Loew, 1863
T. helderbergensis Alexander, 1918
T. inclusa Dietz, 1921
T. ingrata Dietz, 1914
T. inyoensis Alexander, 1946
T. latipennis Loew, 1864
T. madera Doane, 1911
T. monoana Alexander, 1965
T. newcomeri Doane, 1911
T. paiuta Alexander, 1948
T. resurgens Walker, 1848
T. rohweri Doane, 1911
T. subunca Pilipenko, 1998
T. unca Wiedemann, 1817
T. yellowstonensis Alexander, 1946

Dendrotipula

Subgenus Dendrotipula Savchenko, 1964
T. curvicauda Alexander, 1923
T. dichroistigma Alexander, 1920
T. flavolineata Meigen, 1804
T. fortistyla Alexander, 1934
T. hoi Alexander, 1936
T. isshikii Alexander, 1921
T. nigrosignata Alexander, 1924
T. westwoodiana Alexander, 1924

Emodotipula

Subgenus Emodotipula Alexander, 1966
T. breviscapha Alexander, 1953
T. fabriciana Alexander, 1966
T. goetghebuerana Alexander, 1970
T. gomina Dufour, 2003
T. hemmingseni Alexander, 1968
T. hintoniana Alexander, 1968
T. holoteles Alexander, 1924
T. leo Dufour, 1991
T. lishanensis Young, 2014
T. marmoratipennis Brunetti, 1912
T. multibarbata Alexander, 1935
T. multisetosa Alexander, 1935
T. naviculifer Alexander, 1920
T. obscuriventris Strobl, 1900
T. saginata Bergroth, 1891
T. shogun Alexander, 1921
T. stylostena Alexander, 1961
T. submarmoratipennis Alexander, 1936
T. tenuiloba Alexander, 1971
T. thailandica Young, 2014
T. vaillantiana Alexander, 1964
T. yangi Men, 2019
T. yaoluopingensis Men, 2015

Eremotipula
Subgenus Eremotipula Alexander, 1965

T. anasazi Gelhaus, 2005
T. artemisiae Gelhaus, 2005
T. baumanni Gelhaus, 2005
T. biproducta Alexander, 1947
T. byersi Gelhaus, 2005
T. dimidiata Dietz, 1921
T. disspina Gelhaus, 2005
T. diversa Dietz, 1921
T. elverae Gelhaus, 2005
T. eurystyla Alexander, 1969
T. evalynae Gelhaus, 2005
T. helferi Alexander, 1965
T. impudica Doane, 1901
T. incisa Doane, 1901
T. jicarilla Gelhaus, 2005
T. jongelhausi Oosterbroek, 2009
T. kaibabensis Alexander, 1946
T. kirkwoodi Alexander, 1961
T. larreae Gelhaus, 2005
T. leiocantha Alexander, 1959
T. lyrifera Dietz, 1921
T. macracantha Alexander, 1946
T. maderensis Gelhaus, 2005
T. madina Dietz, 1921
T. melanderiana Alexander, 1965
T. middlekauffi Alexander, 1965
T. mitrata Dietz, 1921
T. pellucida Doane, 1912
T. rogersi Gelhaus, 2005
T. sackeni Gelhaus, 2005
T. schusteri Alexander, 1965
T. sinistra Dietz, 1921
T. spaldingi Dietz, 1921
T. spinerecta Alexander, 1947
T. spinosa Gelhaus, 2005
T. utahicola Alexander, 1948
T. woodi Alexander, 1948

Eumicrotipula
Subgenus Eumicrotipula Alexander, 1923

T. abortiva Alexander, 1914
T. absona Alexander, 1937
T. accipitrina Alexander, 1946
T. accumulatrix Alexander, 1951
T. acroleuca Alexander, 1978
T. aedon Alexander, 1947
T. aglossa Alexander, 1962
T. agrippina Alexander, 1946
T. albifasciata Macquart, 1838
T. amblythrix Alexander, 1967
T. amphion Alexander, 1952
T. andalgala Alexander, 1919
T. andina Brethes, 1909
T. andromache Alexander, 1950
T. angolensis Alexander, 1944
T. antarctica Alexander, 1920
T. anthonympha Alexander, 1928
T. apterogyne Philippi, 1866
T. araguensis Alexander, 1950
T. araucania Alexander, 1929
T. arecuna Alexander, 1931
T. arenae Alexander, 1981
T. armillata Alexander, 1916
T. asaroton Alexander, 1962
T. asteria Alexander, 1951
T. atacama Alexander, 1912
T. atameles Alexander, 1966
T. atroscapa Alexander, 1949
T. atrovelutina (Alexander, 1928)
T. auricomata Alexander, 1942
T. austroandina Alexander, 1929
T. azteca Alexander, 1925
T. backstromi Alexander, 1920
T. balloui Alexander, 1938
T. barretoi Alexander, 1923
T. bathromeces Alexander, 1962
T. belemensis Alexander, 1971
T. biacerva Alexander, 1971
T. bigotiana Alexander, 1920
T. bogotana Alexander, 1938
T. brethesiana Alexander, 1929
T. brevicoma Alexander, 1944
T. browniana Alexander, 1940
T. bruchi Alexander, 1920
T. callisto Alexander, 1944
T. callithrix Alexander, 1944
T. campa Alexander, 1914
T. capucina Alexander, 1947
T. carizona Alexander, 1913
T. chacopata Alexander, 1944
T. chanchanensis Alexander, 1969
T. charmosyne Alexander, 1967
T. chicana Alexander, 1945
T. chilensis Alexander, 1920
T. chillanica Alexander, 1945
T. chilota Alexander, 1929
T. chiricahuensis Alexander, 1946
T. clarkiana Alexander, 1929
T. clavaria Alexander, 1946
T. coloptera Alexander, 1981
T. consonata Alexander, 1940
T. conspicillata Alexander, 1945
T. coronaria Alexander, 1940
T. crepera Alexander, 1952
T. cristata Alexander, 1945
T. crossospila Alexander, 1929
T. curinao Alexander, 1914
T. cyclomera Alexander, 1951
T. darlingtoniana Alexander, 1939
T. delectata Alexander, 1940
T. diardis Alexander, 1969
T. dictyophora Alexander, 1962
T. dimorpha Alexander, 1929
T. diodonta Alexander, 1969
T. duidae Alexander, 1931
T. duseni Alexander, 1920
T. efficax Alexander, 1945
T. emerita Alexander, 1944
T. enderleinana Alexander, 1929
T. estella Alexander, 1970
T. euprepia Alexander, 1979
T. exilis Alexander, 1916
T. expleta Alexander, 1962
T. fatidica Alexander, 1940
T. fazi Alexander, 1928
T. flavidula Alexander, 1940
T. flavoannulata Jacobs, 1900
T. flavopedicellaris Alexander, 1979
T. foersteriana Alexander, 1967
T. forsteri Alexander, 1962
T. fortior Alexander, 1951
T. fraudulenta Alexander, 1928
T. fuegiensis Alexander, 1920
T. glaphyroptera Philippi, 1866
T. glossophora Alexander, 1962
T. graphica Schiner, 1868
T. guarani Alexander, 1914
T. hadrotrichia Alexander, 1979
T. hedymopa Alexander, 1944
T. hostifica Alexander, 1937
T. huanca Alexander, 1945
T. hylonympha Alexander, 1929
T. iguazuensis (Alexander, 1928)
T. immerens Alexander, 1944
T. immorsa Alexander, 1945
T. inaequiarmata Alexander, 1962
T. inaequidens Alexander, 1946
T. inca Alexander, 1912
T. incondita Alexander, 1951
T. infidelis Alexander, 1951
T. infinita Alexander, 1945
T. innubens Alexander, 1942
T. invigilans Alexander, 1951
T. itatiayensis Alexander, 1944
T. jacobsiana Alexander, 1929
T. jaennickeana Alexander, 1929
T. jivaro Alexander, 1916
T. jubilans Alexander, 1940
T. juventa Alexander, 1937
T. kathema Alexander, 1966
T. kuehlhorni Alexander, 1962
T. kuscheli Alexander, 1967
T. lanigera Alexander, 1928
T. laterosetosa Alexander, 1931
T. latifolia Alexander, 1944
T. legitima (Alexander, 1928)
T. lethe Alexander, 1971
T. ligulata Alexander, 1929
T. ligulipenicillata Alexander, 1946
T. longibasis Alexander, 1946
T. longurioides Alexander, 1955
T. macintyreana Alexander, 1941
T. macrotrichiata (Alexander, 1923)
T. magellanica Alexander, 1920
T. marmoripennis Rondani, 1850
T. martinbrowni Alexander, 1946
T. mecoglossa Alexander, 1967
T. mediodentata Alexander, 1944
T. meridiana Edwards, 1920
T. microspilota Alexander, 1928
T. miranha Alexander, 1913
T. mithradates Alexander, 1951
T. mitua Alexander, 1916
T. mocoa Alexander, 1913
T. moctezumae Alexander, 1925
T. monilifera Loew, 1851
T. moniliferoides Alexander, 1920
T. moniliformis von Roder, 1886
T. mordax Alexander, 1945
T. morphea Alexander, 1946
T. navarinoensis Alexander, 1962
T. neivai Alexander, 1940
T. nethis Alexander, 1966
T. nigriscapa Alexander, 1946
T. nimbinervis Alexander, 1946
T. nolens Alexander, 1966
T. nordenskjoldi Alexander, 1920
T. nothofagetorum Alexander, 1929
T. notoria Alexander, 1942
T. novaleonensis Alexander, 1940
T. novatrix Alexander, 1942
T. nubifera van der Wulp, 1881
T. nubleana Alexander, 1969
T. obirata Alexander, 1940
T. obscuricincta Alexander, 1940
T. odontomera Alexander, 1967
T. olssoniana Alexander, 1943
T. omnilutea Alexander, 1967
T. ona Alexander, 1920
T. oreonympha Alexander, 1929
T. orizabensis Alexander, 1941
T. ornaticornis van der Wulp, 1891
T. osculata Alexander, 1944
T. palenca Alexander, 1944
T. palitans Alexander, 1966
T. pallidineuris Macquart, 1846
T. pallidisignata Alexander, 1929
T. pantherina Alexander, 1941
T. paranensis Alexander, 1945
T. parviloba Alexander, 1929
T. patagonica Alexander, 1920
T. pediformis Alexander, 1962
T. perflavidula Alexander, 1979
T. perjovialis Alexander, 1944
T. perstudiosa Alexander, 1937
T. petalura Alexander, 1953
T. petaluroides Alexander, 1969
T. petiolaris Alexander, 1940
T. phalangioides Alexander, 1945
T. philippiana Alexander, 1920
T. pictipennis Walker, 1837
T. pilulifera Edwards, 1920
T. pirioni Alexander, 1929
T. piro Alexander, 1914
T. platytergata Alexander, 1962
T. procericornis Edwards, 1920
T. profuga Alexander, 1938
T. protrudens Alexander, 1952
T. psittacina Alexander, 1962
T. pulchriflava Alexander, 1979
T. quadrisetosa Alexander, 1951
T. quichua Alexander, 1916
T. reciproca Alexander, 1946
T. redunca Alexander, 1967
T. reedi Alexander, 1934
T. resplendens Alexander, 1946
T. riveti Edwards, 1920
T. rucana Alexander, 1946
T. rufirostris Bigot, 1888
T. runtunensis Alexander, 1940
T. sariapampae Alexander, 1967
T. satrapa Alexander, 1952
T. schachovskoyi Alexander, 1952
T. scriptella Alexander, 1940
T. semivulpina Alexander, 1944
T. serrilobata Alexander, 1941
T. serval Alexander, 1937
T. songoana Alexander, 1962
T. spatulifera Alexander, 1928
T. spilota Wiedemann, 1828
T. steinbachi Alexander, 1946
T. stenoglossa Alexander, 1942
T. suavissima Alexander, 1951
T. subandina Philippi, 1866
T. subcana Edwards, 1920
T. subglabrata Alexander, 1951
T. subjubilans Alexander, 1979
T. subligulata Alexander, 1941
T. tabida Enderlein, 1912
T. tainoleuca Alexander, 1981
T. tanymetra Alexander, 1962
T. tehuelche Alexander, 1920
T. tephronota Alexander, 1942
T. tersa Alexander, 1928
T. tersoides Alexander, 1945
T. thalia Alexander, 1946
T. tiolomana Oosterbroek, 2009
T. tovarensis Alexander, 1947
T. triemarginata Alexander, 1936
T. trispilota Alexander, 1942
T. tristillata Alexander, 1929
T. tunguraguana Alexander, 1940
T. tyranna Alexander, 1946
T. unistriata Alexander, 1941
T. ursula Alexander, 1951
T. valdiviana Philippi, 1866
T. varineura (Bigot, 1888)
T. virgulata Williston, 1900
T. votiva Alexander, 1944
T. werneri Alexander, 1950
T. willinki Alexander, 1962
T. wittei Alexander, 1920
T. woytkowskiana Alexander, 1942
T. yanamonteana Alexander, 1945
T. yungasensis Alexander, 1962
T. zeltale Alexander, 1928
T. zeugmata Alexander, 1951
T. zotzil Alexander, 1928

Formotipula

Subgenus Formotipula Matsumura, 1916
T. cinereifrons de Meijere, 1911
T. decurvans Alexander, 1950
T. dikchuensis Edwards, 1932
T. dusun Edwards, 1933
T. exusta Alexander, 1931
T. friedrichi Alexander, 1935
T. gongshanensis Men, 2020
T. holoserica (Matsumura, 1916)
T. hypopygialis Alexander, 1924
T. ishana Alexander, 1953
T. kiangsuensis Alexander, 1938
T. laosica Edwards, 1926
T. leopoldi Alexander, 1937
T. lipophleps Edwards, 1926
T. ludingana Li, Ding and Naizhong, 2013
T. luteicorporis Alexander, 1933
T. maolana Li, Ding and Naizhong, 2013
T. medogensis Men, 2020
T. melanomera Walker, 1848
T. melanopyga Edwards, 1926
T. obliterata Alexander, 1924
T. omeicola Alexander, 1935
T. rufizona Edwards, 1916
T. rufoabdominalis Alexander, 1927
T. sciariformis Brunetti, 1911
T. spoliatrix Alexander, 1941
T. stoneana Alexander, 1943
T. tjederana Alexander, 1966
T. unirubra Alexander, 1935
T. vindex Alexander, 1940

Hesperotipula

Subgenus Hesperotipula Alexander, 1947
T. aitkeniana Alexander, 1944
T. arnaudi Alexander, 1965
T. californica (Doane, 1908)
T. chlorion Alexander, 1965
T. chumash Alexander, 1961
T. circularis Alexander, 1947
T. contortrix Alexander, 1944
T. coronado Alexander, 1946
T. derbyi Doane, 1912
T. fragmentata Dietz, 1919
T. linsdalei Alexander, 1951
T. micheneri Alexander, 1944
T. millardi Alexander, 1965
T. mutica Dietz, 1919
T. opisthocera Dietz, 1919
T. ovalis Alexander, 1951
T. sanctaeluciae Alexander, 1951
T. streptocera Doane, 1901
T. supplicata Alexander, 1944
T. sweetae Alexander, 1931
T. trypetophora Dietz, 1919

Indratipula

Subgenus Indratipula Alexander, 1970
T. comstockana Alexander, 1970
T. needhamana Alexander, 1968

Kalatipula

Subgenus Kalatipula Alexander, 1971
T. skuseana Alexander, 1971

Labiotipula

Subgenus Labiotipula Alexander, 1965
T. leechi Alexander, 1938
T. macrolabis Loew, 1864
T. macrolaboides Alexander, 1918
T. youngi Alexander, 1927

Lindnerina

Subgenus Lindnerina Mannheims, 1965
T. bistilata Lundstrom, 1907
T. dershavini Alexander, 1934
T. illinoiensis Alexander, 1915
T. neptun Dietz, 1921
T. senega Alexander, 1915
T. serta Loew, 1863
T. shieldsi Alexander, 1965
T. subexcisa Lundstrom, 1907
T. subserta Alexander, 1928

Lunatipula
Subgenus Lunatipula Edwards, 1931

T. abscissa Alexander, 1946
T. absconsa Alexander, 1936
T. accurata Alexander, 1927
T. acudens Theischinger, 1977
T. acuminata Strobl, 1900
T. acutipleura Doane, 1912
T. adapazariensis Theischinger, 1987
T. adusta Savchenko, 1954
T. adzharolivida Savchenko, 1968
T. affinis Schummel, 1833
T. alaska Alexander, 1918
T. albofascia Doane, 1901
T. albostriata Strobl, 1909
T. alpina Loew, 1873
T. ampliata Alexander, 1925
T. ampullifera Mannheims, 1965
T. angela Mannheims, 1963
T. angelica Theowald, 1957
T. anicilla Mannheims, 1967
T. animula Mannheims, 1967
T. annulicornuta Alexander, 1922
T. anthe Mannheims, 1968
T. antichasia Theischinger, 1979
T. antilope Theischinger, 1977
T. aperta Alexander, 1918
T. aphrodite Mannheims, 1963
T. apicalis Loew, 1863
T. ariadne Mannheims, 1954
T. armata Doane, 1901
T. arnoldii Savchenko, 1957
T. artemis Theischinger, 1977
T. astigma Savchenko, 1968
T. atreia Petersen & Gelhaus, 2004
T. atrisumma Doane, 1912
T. auriculata Mannheims, 1963
T. aurita Riedel, 1920
T. australis Doane, 1901
T. bactridica Savchenko, 1954
T. balearica Mannheims, 1968
T. barbata Doane, 1901
T. beieri Mannheims, 1954
T. bernardinensis Alexander, 1946
T. bernhardi Theischinger, 2009
T. berytia Mannheims, 1963
T. bezzii Mannheims & Theowald, 1959
T. biaculeata Alexander, 1949
T. biavicularia Alexander, 1965
T. bicornis Forbes, 1890
T. bifalcata Doane, 1912
T. bifasciculata Loew, 1873
T. bigeminata Alexander, 1915
T. bimacula Theowald, 1980
T. bisetosa Doane, 1901
T. bispina Loew, 1873
T. biuncus Doane, 1912
T. bivittata Pierre, 1922
T. boregoensis Alexander, 1946
T. borysthenica Savchenko, 1954
T. brinki Theischinger, 1987
T. bucera Alexander, 1927
T. buchholzi Mannheims & Theowald, 1959
T. bulbosa Mannheims, 1954
T. bullata Loew, 1873
T. calcarata Doane, 1901
T. canakkalensis Theischinger, 1987
T. canariensis Theischinger, 1979
T. capra Theischinger, 1980
T. capreola Mannheims, 1966
T. carens Theischinger, 1987
T. cassiope Mannheims, 1966
T. catawba Alexander, 1915
T. caucasica Riedel, 1920
T. caudatula Loew, 1862
T. caudispina Pierre, 1921
T. cava Riedel, 1913
T. cedrophila Mannheims, 1963
T. cerva Mannheims & Theowald, 1959
T. cervula Mannheims & Theowald, 1959
T. charybdis Theischinger, 1979
T. chelifera Savchenko, 1964
T. chernavini Alexander, 1934
T. chloris Savchenko, 1972
T. christophi Theischinger, 1982
T. cillibema Koc, 2004
T. cinerascens Loew, 1873
T. cinereicolor Pierre, 1924
T. cinerella Pierre, 1919
T. circe Mannheims, 1954
T. circumdata Siebke, 1863
T. cirrata de Jong, 1995
T. cirratula Oosterbroek, 1997
T. cladacantha Alexander, 1945
T. cladacanthodes Alexander, 1964
T. clio Mannheims, 1954
T. cornicula Pierre, 1922
T. corollata Yang & Yang, 1995
T. costaloides Alexander, 1915
T. cressa Mannheims, 1965
T. cretis Mannheims, 1965
T. ctenura Savchenko, 1952
T. curvata Theischinger, 1977
T. curvispina Savchenko, 1954
T. cypris Mannheims, 1963
T. cypropeliostigma Vogtenhuber, 2002
T. dampfiana Alexander, 1946
T. danieli Simova-Tosic, 1972
T. decolor Mannheims, 1963
T. dedecor Loew, 1873
T. degeneri Alexander, 1944
T. densursi Alexander, 1943
T. deserticola Savchenko, 1968
T. detruncata Oosterbroek, 1997
T. diabolica Alexander, 1954
T. diacanthophora Alexander, 1945
T. diarizos Vogtenhuber, 2002
T. dido Alexander, 1947
T. didymotes Theischinger, 1977
T. dietziana Alexander, 1915
T. disjuncta Walker, 1856
T. dolores Mannheims, 1967
T. dolosa Alexander, 1936
T. dorica Mannheims, 1965
T. dorsimacula Walker, 1848
T. downesi Alexander, 1944
T. dracula Theischinger, 1977
T. dumetorum Savchenko, 1964
T. duplex Walker, 1848
T. dupliciformis Alexander, 1940
T. eleniya Lantsov and Pilipenko, 2021
T. emmahelene Theischinger, 1980
T. engeli Theowald, 1957
T. erato Mannheims, 1954
T. erectispina Savchenko, 1954
T. eugeniana Simova-Tosic, 1972
T. euterpe Theischinger, 1979
T. eyndhoveni Theowald, 1972
T. fabiola Mannheims, 1968
T. falcata Riedel, 1913
T. fascicula Mannheims, 1966
T. fascingulata Mannheims, 1966
T. fascipennis Meigen, 1818
T. fattigiana Alexander, 1944
T. fenderi Alexander, 1954
T. filamentosa Alexander, 1959
T. fini Oosterbroek, 1997
T. finitima Alexander, 1936
T. flabellifera Savchenko, 1954
T. flaccida Alexander, 1934
T. flavibasis Alexander, 1918
T. flavocauda Doane, 1912
T. flavomarginata Doane, 1912
T. forcipula Mannheims, 1966
T. franzressli Theischinger, 1982
T. freidbergi Theowald & Oosterbroek, 1987
T. fuliginosa (Say, 1823)
T. fulminis Alexander, 1945
T. fulvinodus Doane, 1912
T. furcula Mannheims, 1954
T. furiosa Alexander, 1941
T. fuscicosta Mannheims, 1954
T. gallaeca Eiroa, 1989
T. gebze Koc, Hasbenli & Vogtenhuber, 2007
T. geja Savchenko, 1968
T. gelensis Loi, 1971
T. georgiana Alexander, 1915
T. gibbifera Strobl, 1906
T. gondattii Alexander, 1934
T. graeca Oosterbroek & Vukovic, 1989
T. graecolivida Mannheims, 1954
T. grahamina Alexander, 1963
T. griesheimae Mannheims & Theowald, 1959
T. handschini Mannheims, 1967
T. harmonia Mannheims, 1966
T. hastingsae Alexander, 1951
T. helvola Loew, 1873
T. hera Theischinger, 1979
T. hermes Theischinger, 1977
T. heros Egger, 1863
T. hirsuta Doane, 1901
T. hirsuticauda Pierre, 1925
T. hispanolivida Mannheims, 1968
T. holzschuhi Theischinger, 1977
T. horsti Theischinger, 1982
T. huberti Theischinger, 1982
T. humilis Staeger, 1840
T. hybrida Savchenko, 1952
T. hypovalvata Alexander, 1936
T. hyrcana Savchenko, 1973
T. iberica Mannheims, 1963
T. iliensis Mannheims, 1965
T. imbecilla Loew, 1869
T. inadusta Alexander, 1946
T. interrita Alexander, 1938
T. inusitata Alexander, 1949
T. istriana Erhan & Theowald, 1961
T. jaroslavi Koc, 2007
T. jativensis Strobl, 1909
T. johnsoniana Alexander, 1915
T. kephalos Theischinger, 1979
T. kerkis Theischinger, 1977
T. kinzelbachi Theischinger, 1982
T. kirkwoodiana Alexander, 1965
T. klytaimnestra Theischinger, 1979
T. korovini Savchenko, 1970
T. kreissli Theischinger, 1987
T. kumerloevei Mannheims, 1968
T. kybele Mannheims, 1968
T. kykladon Theischinger, 1987
T. laetabilis Zetterstedt, 1838
T. lagunicola Alexander, 1969
T. lamellata Doane, 1901
T. lamentaria Alexander, 1934
T. lanispina Mannheims, 1966
T. lassenensis Alexander, 1965
T. latistyla Savchenko, 1954
T. leda Mannheims, 1965
T. leeuweni Theischinger, 1982
T. lehriana Savchenko, 1964
T. leto Mannheims, 1966
T. limitata Schummel, 1833
T. lithophila Savchenko, 1968
T. livida van der Wulp, 1859
T. loewiana Alexander, 1915
T. longidens Strobl, 1909
T. lucasi Theischinger, 1987
T. lucida Doane, 1901
T. luebenauorum Theischinger, 1977
T. lunata Linnaeus, 1758
T. lyrion Theischinger, 1987
T. macciana Edwards, 1928
T. macnabi Alexander, 1939
T. macquarti Becker, 1908
T. macropeliostigma Mannheims, 1954
T. macropyga Savchenko, 1952
T. macroselene Strobl, 1893
T. macswaini Alexander, 1965
T. magnicauda Strobl, 1895
T. maija Savchenko, 1973
T. mainensis Alexander, 1915
T. mallochi Alexander, 1920
T. mallorca Theischinger, 1982
T. manca Alexander, 1924
T. mariannae Alexander, 1940
T. mariposa Alexander, 1946
T. martini Alexander, 1965
T. mecotrichia Alexander, 1966
T. megalabiata Alexander, 1915
T. megaura Doane, 1901
T. melanothrix Savchenko & Theischinger, 1978
T. mellea Schummel, 1833
T. melpomene Mannheims, 1954
T. mendli Martinovsky, 1976
T. mercedensis Alexander, 1965
T. meronensis Oosterbroek, 1997
T. mesotergata Alexander, 1931
T. michoacana Alexander, 1946
T. micropeliostigma Mannheims, 1965
T. milkoi Pilipenko, 2005
T. minos Theischinger, 1982
T. miwok Alexander, 1945
T. modesta Macquart, 1846
T. modoc Alexander, 1945
T. mohavensis Alexander, 1946
T. monstrabilis Theischinger, 1980
T. monticola Alexander, 1915
T. montifer Theischinger, 1977
T. morenae Strobl, 1900
T. mormon Alexander, 1948
T. morrisoni Alexander, 1915
T. murati Koc, 2004
T. musensis Theischinger, 1987
T. naumanni Theischinger, 1979
T. nausicaa Mannheims, 1966
T. neutra Theischinger, 1982
T. nigdeensis Bischof, 1905
T. nigrobasalis Alexander, 1933
T. nocturna Savchenko, 1964
T. olympia Doane, 1912
T. onusta Riedel, 1913
T. oorschotorum Theischinger, 1987
T. oosterbroeki Koc, 2007
T. oreada Alexander, 1933
T. ornithogona Theischinger, 1982
T. osmana Mannheims, 1963
T. oxytona Alexander, 1927
T. pachyprocta Loew, 1873
T. palifera Mannheims, 1965
T. pallidicornis Savchenko, 1954
T. pallidithorax Savchenko, 1954
T. palmarum Alexander, 1947
T. pandora Mannheims, 1968
T. pannonia Loew, 1873
T. parallela Theischinger, 1977
T. parapeliostigma Mannheims & Theowald, 1959
T. pararecticornis Savchenko & Theischinger, 1978
T. parasimurg Savchenko, 1968
T. paravelox Theischinger, 1987
T. parshleyi Alexander, 1915
T. pelidne Mannheims, 1965
T. peliostigma Schummel, 1833
T. pelma Mannheims, 1965
T. pendula Alexander, 1924
T. penelope Mannheims, 1954
T. penicillata Alexander, 1915
T. perfidiosa Alexander, 1945
T. peteri Theischinger, 1979
T. phaidra Mannheims, 1965
T. pilicauda Pierre, 1922
T. pinnifer Theischinger, 1977
T. pjotri de Jong and Adgir, 2018
T. pleuracicula Alexander, 1915
T. poelli Vogtenhuber, 2012
T. pokornyi Mannheims, 1968
T. polingi Alexander, 1950
T. polycantha Alexander, 1942
T. polydeukes Theischinger, 1977
T. powersi Alexander, 1965
T. praecox Loew, 1873
T. productisterna Alexander, 1963
T. profdrassi Theischinger, 1980
T. pseudocinerascens Strobl, 1906
T. pseudolunata Theischinger, 1980
T. pseudopeliostigma Mannheims, 1965
T. pseudowolfi Theischinger, 1979
T. pustulata Pierre, 1920
T. pythia Theischinger, 1979
T. quadriatrata Alexander, 1956
T. quadridentata Savchenko, 1964
T. quinquespinis Theischinger, 1980
T. rabiosa Alexander, 1943
T. rainiericola Alexander, 1946
T. ramona Alexander, 1941
T. rauschorum Theischinger, 1977
T. raysmithi Alexander, 1965
T. recticornis Schummel, 1833
T. renate Theischinger, 1982
T. retusa Doane, 1901
T. rhodolivida Theowald, 1972
T. rhynchos Theischinger, 1977
T. rocina Theischinger, 1979
T. rossmani Byers, 2003
T. rotundiloba Alexander, 1915
T. rudis Alexander, 1935
T. rufula Mannheims & Theowald, 1959
T. rugulosa Mannheims & Theowald, 1959
T. ruidoso Alexander, 1946
T. russula Theischinger, 1977
T. rutila Savchenko, 1952
T. sacerdotula Riedel, 1918
T. sagittifera Alexander, 1948
T. saltatrix Savchenko, 1964
T. satyr Alexander, 1915
T. savtschenkoi Simova, 1960
T. saxemontana Alexander, 1946
T. saylori Alexander, 1961
T. schlingeri Alexander, 1965
T. sciurus Theischinger, 1977
T. seguyi Mannheims, 1954
T. selenaria Mannheims, 1967
T. selene Meigen, 1830
T. selenis Loew, 1873
T. selenitica Meigen, 1818
T. seminole Alexander, 1915
T. semipeliostigma Mannheims, 1965
T. sepiaformis Vogtenhuber, 2002
T. sequoiarum Alexander, 1945
T. sigma Theischinger, 1979
T. simova Theischinger, 1982
T. simurg Dzhafarov & Savchenko, 1964
T. siskiyouensis Alexander, 1949
T. skylla Theischinger, 1979
T. snoqualmiensis Alexander, 1946
T. soosi Mannheims, 1954
T. spatha Doane, 1912
T. sperryana Alexander, 1942
T. spetai Vogtenhuber, 2012
T. splendens Doane, 1901
T. stalagmites Alexander, 1915
T. sternalis Theischinger, 1977
T. sternata Doane, 1912
T. stimulosa Mannheims, 1973
T. strigosa Savchenko, 1952
T. stubbsi Theischinger, 1979
T. subacuminata Mannheims, 1963
T. subaurita Savchenko, 1964
T. subbarbata Alexander, 1927
T. subbispina Savchenko, 1952
T. subcava Mannheims, 1963
T. subfalcata Mannheims, 1967
T. subhelvola Mannheims & Theowald, 1959
T. sublimitata Alexander, 1927
T. sublunata Savchenko, 1952
T. submaculata Loew, 1863
T. submanca Savchenko, 1964
T. subonusta Mannheims & Theowald, 1959
T. subpustulata Mannheims, 1963
T. subrecticornis Savchenko, 1964
T. subselenitica Theowald, 1957
T. substernalis Oosterbroek, 1997
T. subtrunca Mannheims, 1966
T. subtruncata Mannheims, 1954
T. subvelox Savchenko, 1968
T. suleika Mannheims, 1963
T. sushkini Savchenko, 1964
T. talyshensis Savchenko, 1964
T. tanap Koc and Can, 2020
T. tanneri Alexander, 1948
T. tateyamae Alexander, 1918
T. tazzekai Theowald, 1973
T. tenaya Alexander, 1946
T. tergata Doane, 1912
T. tergestina Loew, 1873
T. teunisseni Theischinger, 1979
T. texensis Alexander, 1916
T. thais Mannheims, 1963
T. theia Mannheims, 1963
T. theowaldi Savchenko, 1964
T. tibonella Theischinger, 1977
T. timberlakei Alexander, 1947
T. titania Mannheims, 1966
T. transcaspica Savchenko, 1954
T. transfixa Alexander, 1933
T. translucida Doane, 1901
T. transmarmarensis Koc, Aktas & Oosterbroek, 1996
T. trapeza Theischinger, 1982
T. trialbosignata Alexander, 1935
T. trifasciculata Strobl, 1900
T. trigona Mannheims, 1966
T. trispinosa Lundstrom, 1907
T. triton Alexander, 1915
T. truculenta Alexander, 1943
T. trunca Mannheims, 1954
T. truncata Loew, 1873
T. turanensis Alexander, 1934
T. turca Mannheims, 1963
T. turcolivida Mannheims, 1968
T. turgida Oosterbroek, 1997
T. tuscarora Alexander, 1915
T. twightae Alexander, 1959
T. tyche Mannheims, 1966
T. ulrike Theischinger, 1982
T. unicincta Doane, 1901
T. unicornis Theischinger, 1977
T. urania Mannheims, 1954
T. ursulae Mannheims, 1965
T. usitata Doane, 1901
T. valerii Savchenko, 1968
T. valida Loew, 1863
T. validicornis Alexander, 1934
T. vermooleni Theischinger, 1987
T. vernalis Meigen, 1804
T. verrucosa Pierre, 1919
T. vesubiana Dufour, 2003
T. vitabilis Alexander, 1947
T. vittatipennis Doane, 1912
T. vogtenhuberi Theischinger, 1979
T. vulpecula Theischinger, 1979
T. wewalkai Theischinger, 1979
T. willissmithi Alexander, 1945
T. wolfi Mannheims, 1954
T. xyrophora Theischinger, 1977
T. yana Alexander, 1965
T. yosemite Alexander, 1946
T. zaitzevi Savchenko, 1952
T. zangherii Lackschewitz, 1932
T. zarcoi Mannheims, 1967
T. zarnigor Savchenko, 1954
T. zelotypa Alexander, 1946
T. zimini Savchenko, 1954

Mediotipula

Subgenus Mediotipula Pierre, 1924
T. anatoliensis Theowald, 1978
T. brolemanni Pierre, 1922
T. cataloniensis Theowald, 1978
T. caucasiensis Theowald, 1978
T. fulvogrisea (Pierre, 1924)
T. galiciensis Theowald, 1978
T. gjipeensis Keresztes and Kolcsar, 2018
T. mikiana Bergroth, 1888
T. nitidicollis Strobl, 1909
T. sarajevensis Strobl, 1898
T. siebkei Zetterstedt, 1852
T. stigmatella Schummel, 1833

Microtipula
Subgenus Microtipula Alexander, 1912

T. aequitorialis Alexander, 1940
T. affabilis Alexander, 1945
T. akestra Alexander, 1966
T. alecto Alexander, 1945
T. amara Alexander, 1951
T. amazonica (Alexander, 1912)
T. amoenicornis Alexander, 1922
T. anomalina Alexander, 1979
T. apollyon Alexander, 1951
T. appendens (Enderlein, 1912)
T. ariranhae Alexander, 1945
T. armatipennis Alexander, 1912
T. auricularis Alexander, 1942
T. austrovolens Alexander, 1951
T. aymara Alexander, 1912
T. baeostyla Alexander, 1979
T. bigracilis Alexander, 1979
T. bilimeki Alexander, 1941
T. biprolata Alexander, 1967
T. bitribula Alexander, 1967
T. blaseri Alexander, 1942
T. brasiliensis (Wiedemann, 1828)
T. bruesi Alexander, 1945
T. camura Alexander, 1979
T. carib Alexander, 1970
T. cerogama Alexander, 1944
T. cithariformis Alexander, 1967
T. colombicola Alexander, 1929
T. contemplata Alexander, 1951
T. costaricensis (Alexander, 1922)
T. crassistyla Alexander, 1966
T. ctenopyga Alexander, 1940
T. decens Alexander, 1942
T. decolorata (Alexander, 1935)
T. detecta Alexander, 1927
T. diacanthos Alexander, 1921
T. diadexia Alexander, 1967
T. didactyla Alexander, 1942
T. didolos Alexander, 1962
T. dirhabdophora Alexander, 1951
T. discophora Alexander, 1951
T. efferox Alexander, 1945
T. effeta Alexander, 1921
T. effulta Alexander, 1941
T. epione Alexander, 1944
T. erebus Alexander, 1979
T. erostrata Alexander, 1945
T. eurymera Alexander, 1945
T. extensistyla Alexander, 1979
T. falcifer Alexander, 1944
T. feliciana Alexander, 1945
T. ferocia Alexander, 1937
T. fiebrigi Alexander, 1941
T. flavopolita Alexander, 1942
T. gladiator Alexander, 1914
T. guato Alexander, 1912
T. guerreroensis Alexander, 1940
T. gutticellula Alexander, 1936
T. heterodactyla Alexander, 1944
T. hexamelania Alexander, 1951
T. histrionica Alexander, 1945
T. horribilis Alexander, 1945
T. icasta Alexander, 1941
T. impatiens Alexander, 1951
T. inaequilobata Alexander, 1938
T. inarmata Alexander, 1928
T. infida Alexander, 1941
T. intemperata Alexander, 1943
T. jivaronis Alexander, 1943
T. jordanensis Alexander, 1949
T. juquiella Alexander, 1945
T. klagesi Alexander, 1945
T. lagotis Alexander, 1942
T. languidula Alexander, 1942
T. laticostata Alexander, 1937
T. letalis Alexander, 1937
T. lichyana Alexander, 1945
T. luctifica Alexander, 1940
T. luteidorsata Alexander, 1971
T. luteilimbata Alexander, 1944
T. lyriformis Alexander, 1942
T. macrosterna (Alexander, 1912)
T. mandator Alexander, 1945
T. manniana Alexander, 1945
T. mediocompressa Alexander, 1944
T. megalyra Alexander, 1945
T. monocera Alexander, 1967
T. mulfordi Alexander, 1945
T. multimoda Alexander, 1938
T. myriatricha Alexander, 1942
T. neolenta Alexander, 1945
T. nicoya Alexander, 1944
T. nigroabdominalis (Alexander, 1936)
T. nigrovariegata Alexander, 1928
T. niobe Alexander, 1947
T. obstinata Alexander, 1971
T. opipara Alexander, 1951
T. ortoni Alexander, 1945
T. pala Alexander, 1939
T. palaeogama Alexander, 1944
T. paloides Alexander, 1940
T. paralenta Alexander, 1950
T. pararia Alexander, 1966
T. parishi Alexander, 1912
T. penana Alexander, 1951
T. perangustula Alexander, 1938
T. percompressa Alexander, 1944
T. percomptaria Alexander, 1945
T. perdelecta Alexander, 1942
T. perissopyga Alexander, 1979
T. perlaticosta Alexander, 1941
T. plaumannina Alexander, 1945
T. plumbeithorax Alexander, 1921
T. pontifex Alexander, 1967
T. porrecta Alexander, 1951
T. pretiosa Alexander, 1945
T. pritchardi Alexander, 1940
T. proctotricha Alexander, 1945
T. prolixisterna Alexander, 1941
T. quadricollis Alexander, 1945
T. rectangulus Alexander, 1951
T. regressa Alexander, 1950
T. retrorsa Alexander, 1962
T. scaphula Alexander, 1945
T. scelesta Alexander, 1945
T. schildeana Alexander, 1945
T. schunkei Alexander, 1971
T. schwarzmaieri Alexander, 1940
T. septemhastata Alexander, 1962
T. sexcincta Alexander, 1942
T. smilodon Alexander, 1940
T. smithi Alexander, 1912
T. sparsipila Alexander, 1962
T. spinicauda Alexander, 1919
T. sternohirsuta Alexander, 1941
T. subarmata Alexander, 1941
T. subaymara Alexander, 1962
T. subeffeta Alexander, 1951
T. subeffulta Alexander, 1969
T. subinfuscata Williston, 1896
T. tancitaro Alexander, 1946
T. temperata Alexander, 1940
T. tenuicula Enderlein, 1912
T. tenuilobata Alexander, 1940
T. tergoarmata Alexander, 1971
T. terpsichore Alexander, 1951
T. terribilis Alexander, 1944
T. tijucensis Alexander, 1943
T. topoensis Alexander, 1951
T. trichoprocta Alexander, 1945
T. trihastata Alexander, 1945
T. trinidadensis (Alexander, 1912)
T. trinitatis Alexander, 1941
T. tucumanensis Alexander, 1945
T. urophora Alexander, 1938
T. virgilia Alexander, 1951
T. volens Alexander, 1944
T. zeteki Alexander, 1945
T. zonalis Alexander, 1927

Nesotipula

Subgenus Nesotipula Alexander, 1921
T. pribilovia Alexander, 1921

Nippotipula

Subgenus Nippotipula Matsumura, 1916
T. abdominalis (Say, 1823)
T. anastomosa Edwards, 1928
T. brevifusa Alexander, 1940
T. champasakensis Zhang, Ren, Li and Yang, 2020
T. coquilletti Enderlein, 1912
T. edwardsomyia Alexander, 1964
T. fanjingshana Yang & Yang, 1988
T. flavostigmalis Alexander, 1953
T. kertesziana Alexander, 1964
T. klapperichi Alexander, 1941
T. masakiana Alexander, 1968
T. metacomet Alexander, 1965
T. phaedina (Alexander, 1927)
T. pseudophaedina Yang & Yang, 1992
T. pulcherrima Brunetti, 1912
T. sinica Alexander, 1935
T. susurrans Edwards, 1932

Nobilotipula

Subgenus Nobilotipula Alexander, 1943
T. brolemanniana Alexander, 1968
T. collaris Say, 1823
T. fuiana Alexander, 1949
T. nobilis (Loew, 1864)
T. specularis Alexander, 1961
T. wardleana Alexander, 1968

Odonatisca

Subgenus Odonatisca Savchenko, 1956
T. breviligula Alexander, 1956
T. gouldeni Podenas & Gelhaus, 2000
T. kamchatkensis Alexander, 1918
T. nodicornis Meigen, 1818
T. optiva Alexander, 1921
T. pribilofensis Alexander, 1923
T. subarctica Alexander, 1919
T. timptonensis Savchenko, 1956

Papuatipula

Subgenus Papuatipula Alexander, 1935
T. artifex Alexander, 1948
T. consiliosa Alexander, 1971
T. cyclopica Alexander, 1948
T. divergens de Meijere, 1913
T. gressittiana Alexander, 1971
T. insperata Young, 1987
T. koiari Young, 1987
T. leucosticta Alexander, 1934
T. lieftincki Alexander, 1971
T. meijereana Alexander, 1935
T. melanotis Alexander, 1948
T. nigritus Young, 1987
T. nokicola Alexander, 1953
T. novaebrittaniae Alexander, 1935
T. obediens Alexander, 1947
T. omissinervis (de Meijere, 1906)
T. oneili Young, 1987
T. pedicioides Alexander, 1948
T. pensilis Alexander, 1971
T. satirica Alexander, 1971
T. staryi Alexander, 1971
T. strictistyla Alexander, 1971
T. surcularia Alexander, 1947
T. toxopeina Alexander, 1971
T. wibleae Young, 1987

Pectinotipula

Subgenus Pectinotipula Alexander, 1920
T. argentina (van der Wulp, 1881)
T. boliviensis (Alexander, 1946)
T. titicacae (Alexander, 1944)
T. tucumana (Alexander, 1946)

Platytipula
Subgenus Platytipula Matsumura, 1916

T. acifera Alexander, 1926
T. acirostris Alexander, 1954
T. alexanderi Joseph, 1974
T. angustiligula Alexander, 1931
T. appendifera Alexander, 1956
T. autumnalis Loew, 1864
T. bidenticulata Alexander, 1933
T. carinata Doane, 1901
T. chumbiensis Edwards, 1928
T. continuata Brunetti, 1912
T. cumulata Alexander, 1938
T. cunctans Say, 1823
T. cylindrostylata Alexander, 1926
T. dinarzadae Theowald, 1978
T. dissociata Alexander, 1936
T. ecaudata Alexander, 1924
T. esakiana Alexander, 1933
T. hampsoni Edwards, 1927
T. haplostyla Oosterbroek & Theowald, 1992
T. hebeiensis Yang & Yang, 1995
T. honorifica Alexander, 1933
T. hugginsi Gelhaus, 1986
T. imanishii Alexander, 1933
T. indifferens Alexander, 1935
T. insulicola Alexander, 1914
T. jocosipennis Alexander, 1933
T. knowltoniana Alexander, 1969
T. luteipennis Meigen, 1830
T. maritima Alexander, 1930
T. melanoceros Schummel, 1833
T. membranifera Alexander, 1936
T. moiwana (Matsumura, 1916)
T. nebulinervis Alexander, 1940
T. nicothoe Alexander, 1953
T. nigrocellula Alexander, 1935
T. nikkoensis Alexander, 1921
T. nipponensis Alexander, 1914
T. omogicola Alexander, 1954
T. paterifera Alexander, 1962
T. pendulifera Alexander, 1919
T. perhirtipes Alexander, 1963
T. pterotricha Alexander, 1953
T. querula Alexander, 1924
T. quiris Alexander, 1940
T. saragaminensis Alexander, 1954
T. scheherezadae Theowald, 1978
T. sessilis Edwards, 1921
T. sparsiseta Alexander, 1924
T. spenceriana Alexander, 1943
T. stipata Alexander, 1935
T. tennessa Alexander, 1920
T. ultima Alexander, 1915
T. violovitshiana Savchenko, 1961
T. xanthodes Yang & Yang, 1991

Pterelachisus
Subgenus Pterelachisus Rondani, 1842

T. aka Alexander, 1971
T. albertensis Alexander, 1927
T. alcestis Alexander, 1946
T. alta Doane, 1912
T. aluco Alexander, 1918
T. angulata Loew, 1864
T. apicispina Alexander, 1934
T. aspoecki Vogtenhuber, 2004
T. austriaca (Pokorny, 1887)
T. autumna Alexander, 1921
T. badakhensis Alexander, 1956
T. bakeri Alexander, 1954
T. banffiana Alexander, 1946
T. bellardiana Alexander, 1926
T. berteii (Rondani, 1842)
T. biaciculifera Alexander, 1937
T. bilobata Pokorny, 1887
T. brindleana Alexander, 1964
T. brunnicosta Brunetti, 1912
T. camillerii Alexander, 1959
T. carinifrons Holmgren, 1883
T. cavagnaroi Alexander, 1965
T. cayollensis Dufour, 2003
T. cineracea Coquillett, 1900
T. cinereocincta Lundstrom, 1907
T. clinata Alexander, 1938
T. coleana Alexander, 1940
T. crassicornis Zetterstedt, 1838
T. crassiventris Riedel, 1913
T. crawfordi Alexander, 1927
T. cruciata Edwards, 1928
T. curvistylus Eiroa, 1990
T. daitenjoensis Alexander, 1955
T. derbecki Alexander, 1934
T. diflava Alexander, 1919
T. digesta Alexander, 1953
T. dolomitensis Theowald, 1980
T. edwardsella Alexander, 1923
T. entomophthorae Alexander, 1918
T. excetra Alexander, 1935
T. famula Alexander, 1935
T. fautrix Alexander, 1961
T. flavocostalis Alexander, 1921
T. futilis Alexander, 1924
T. garuda Alexander, 1953
T. geisha Alexander, 1958
T. gelida Coquillett, 1900
T. gemula Alexander, 1945
T. glacialis (Pokorny, 1887)
T. gredosi Theowald, 1980
T. haplorhabda Alexander, 1935
T. harutai Alexander, 1955
T. helvocincta Doane, 1901
T. hewitti Alexander, 1919
T. hibii Alexander, 1933
T. hirsutipes Lackschewitz, 1934
T. hispida Savchenko, 1964
T. hollandi Alexander, 1934
T. hoogerwerfi Alexander, 1944
T. horningi Alexander, 1966
T. huntsmaniana Dietz, 1920
T. huron Alexander, 1918
T. hylaea Alexander, 1924
T. icarus Alexander, 1936
T. idahoensis Alexander, 1955
T. ignoscens Alexander, 1935
T. illegitima Alexander, 1933
T. imbellis Alexander, 1927
T. imitator Alexander, 1953
T. incurva Doane, 1912
T. ingenua Alexander, 1945
T. interposita Savchenko, 1966
T. irregularis (Pokorny, 1887)
T. irrorata Macquart, 1826
T. ishiharana Alexander, 1953
T. jedoensis Alexander, 1933
T. jenseni Alexander, 1965
T. jutlandica Nielsen, 1947
T. kaisilai Mannheims, 1954
T. katmaiensis Alexander, 1920
T. kaulbackiana Alexander, 1953
T. kirbyana Alexander, 1918
T. kuatunensis Alexander, 1941
T. kurilensis Savchenko, 1970
T. lacunosa Alexander, 1941
T. laetabunda Alexander, 1961
T. laetibasis Alexander, 1934
T. laetissima Alexander, 1938
T. latiflava Alexander, 1931
T. legalis Alexander, 1933
T. leucopalassa Alexander, 1964
T. leucosema Edwards, 1928
T. limbinervis Alexander, 1953
T. luridorostris Schummel, 1833
T. luteobasalis Savchenko, 1964
T. maaiana Alexander, 1949
T. macarta Alexander, 1936
T. macrostyla Savchenko, 1964
T. malaisei Alexander, 1927
T. mandan Alexander, 1915
T. margarita Alexander, 1918
T. matsumuriana Alexander, 1924
T. mayerduerii Egger, 1863
T. mcdonaldi Alexander, 1975
T. meijerella Alexander, 1966
T. middendorffi Lackschewitz, 1936
T. mitophora Alexander, 1934
T. mono Alexander, 1945
T. mupinensis Alexander, 1934
T. mutila Wahlgren, 1905
T. mutiloides Alexander, 1932
T. mystax Alexander, 1961
T. neurotica Mannheims, 1966
T. niitakensis Alexander, 1938
T. nudicellula Savchenko, 1966
T. obnata Alexander, 1934
T. ochotana Savchenko, 1970
T. octomaculata Savchenko, 1964
T. osellai Theowald, 1980
T. pabulina Meigen, 1818
T. padana Dufour, 1981
T. pauli Mannheims, 1964
T. pedicellaris Alexander, 1933
T. penobscot Alexander, 1915
T. percara Alexander, 1922
T. pertenuis Alexander, 1938
T. phaeopasta Alexander, 1924
T. phryne Alexander, 1945
T. pieli Alexander, 1937
T. pingi Alexander, 1936
T. plitviciensis Simova, 1962
T. polaruralensis Theowald, 1980
T. pollex Alexander, 1933
T. pontica Savchenko, 1964
T. procliva Alexander, 1938
T. pseudobiaciculifera Men, Xue and Wang, 2016
T. pseudocrassiventris Theowald, 1980
T. pseudoirrorata Goetghebuer, 1921
T. pseudopruinosa Strobl, 1895
T. pseudotruncorum Alexander, 1920
T. pseudovariipennis Czizek, 1912
T. ranee Alexander, 1961
T. recondita Pilipenko and Salmela, 2012
T. resupina Alexander, 1935
T. sauteri Dufour, 1982
T. savionis Alexander, 1937
T. sequoicola Alexander, 1947
T. seticellula Alexander, 1932
T. sharva Alexander, 1953
T. shomio Alexander, 1921
T. shoshone Alexander, 1946
T. sibiriensis Alexander, 1925
T. simondsi Alexander, 1965
T. spathifera Mannheims, 1953
T. stenostyla Savchenko, 1964
T. striatipennis Brunetti, 1912
T. strictura Alexander, 1937
T. subfasciata Loew, 1863
T. subfutilis Alexander, 1929
T. subglacialis Mannheims & Theowald, 1959
T. sublimata Alexander, 1953
T. submarmorata Schummel, 1833
T. submutila Alexander, 1933
T. sunda Alexander, 1915
T. taikun Alexander, 1921
T. teleutica Pilipenko, 1999
T. ternaria Loew, 1864
T. tetramelania Alexander, 1935
T. trichopleura Savchenko, 1964
T. tridentata Alexander, 1920
T. trifascingulata Theowald, 1980
T. tristriata Lundstrom, 1915
T. trivittata Say, 1823
T. truncorum Meigen, 1830
T. trupheoneura Alexander, 1920
T. tshernovskii Savchenko, 1954
T. tundrensis Alexander, 1934
T. uenoi Alexander, 1930
T. variata Alexander, 1927
T. varipennis Meigen, 1818
T. vayu Alexander, 1964
T. vermiculata Savchenko, 1964
T. vitiosa Alexander, 1933
T. vivax Alexander, 1933
T. wahlgreni Lackschewitz, 1925
T. wardiana Alexander, 1951
T. wiedemanniana Alexander, 1971
T. winthemi Lackschewitz, 1932
T. wuana Alexander, 1966
T. yasumatsuana Alexander, 1954

Ramatipula

Subgenus Ramatipula Alexander, 1971
T. bagchiana Alexander, 1971
T. bangerterana Alexander, 1964
T. bilobula Alexander, 1938
T. flavithorax Brunetti, 1918
T. kuntzeana Alexander, 1971
T. octacantha Alexander, 1961
T. phallacaena Alexander, 1964
T. pierreana Alexander, 1964
T. podana Alexander, 1971
T. shawiana Alexander, 1953

Savtshenkia
Subgenus Savtshenkia Alexander, 1965

T. aberdareica Alexander, 1956
T. akeleyi Alexander, 1956
T. alpha de Jong, 1994
T. alpium Bergroth, 1888
T. anadyrensis Pilipenko, 2011
T. antricola Riedel, 1918
T. asbolodes Speiser, 1909
T. aspromontensis Theowald, 1973
T. aster Theischinger, 1983
T. atlas Pierre, 1924
T. baltistanica Alexander, 1936
T. benesignata Mannheims, 1954
T. boreosignata Tjeder, 1969
T. breviantennata Lackschewitz, 1933
T. caligo Alexander, 1956
T. cheethami Edwards, 1924
T. chrysocephala Mannheims, 1958
T. confusa van der Wulp, 1883
T. convexifrons Holmgren, 1883
T. corsosignata Theowald, Dufour & Oosterbroek, 1982
T. cyrnosardensis Theowald, Dufour & Oosterbroek, 1982
T. draconis Alexander, 1964
T. eleonorae Theischinger, 1978
T. elgonensis Alexander, 1956
T. eugeni Theowald, 1973
T. fragilina Alexander, 1919
T. fragilis Loew, 1863
T. gimmerthali Lackschewitz, 1925
T. glaucocinerea Lundstrom, 1915
T. goriziensis Strobl, 1893
T. graciae Alexander, 1947
T. grisescens Zetterstedt, 1851
T. haennii Dufour, 1991
T. hancocki Alexander, 1956
T. hartigiana Theowald, Dufour & Oosterbroek, 1982
T. holoptera Edwards, 1939
T. ignobilis Loew, 1863
T. interserta Riedel, 1913
T. invenusta Riedel, 1919
T. jeekeli Mannheims & Theowald, 1959
T. kiushiuensis Alexander, 1925
T. koreana Alexander, 1934
T. letifera Alexander, 1951
T. limbata Zetterstedt, 1838
T. lundbladi Mannheims, 1962
T. macaronesica Savchenko, 1961
T. mannheimsi Theowald, 1973
T. minuscula Savchenko, 1971
T. mohriana Alexander, 1954
T. multipicta Becker, 1908
T. nephrotomoides Alexander, 1924
T. nielseni Mannheims & Theowald, 1959
T. nivalis Savchenko, 1961
T. obsoleta Meigen, 1818
T. odontostyla Savchenko, 1961
T. omega de Jong, 1994
T. ornata Theowald & Oosterbroek, 1987
T. pagana Meigen, 1818
T. pechlaneri Mannheims & Theowald, 1959
T. persignata Alexander, 1945
T. phoroctenia Alexander, 1919
T. postposita Riedel, 1919
T. productella Alexander, 1928
T. rothschildi Alexander, 1920
T. rufina Meigen, 1818
T. sardosignata Mannheims & Theowald, 1959
T. sciadoptera Alexander, 1964
T. serrulifera Alexander, 1942
T. signata Staeger, 1840
T. simulans Savchenko, 1966
T. sordidipes Alexander, 1961
T. staegeri Nielsen, 1922
T. subalpium Savchenko, 1961
T. subnodicornis Zetterstedt, 1838
T. subsignata Lackschewitz, 1933
T. subvafra Lackschewitz, 1936
T. tetragramma Edwards, 1928
T. trinacria de Jong, 1994
T. tulipa Dufour, 1983
T. venerabilis Alexander, 1936
T. villeneuvii Strobl, 1909
T. wulingshana Yang & Yang, 1995

Schummelia
Subgenus Schummelia Edwards, 1931

T. ahrensi Savchenko, 1957
T. annulicornis Say, 1829
T. argentacea Alexander, 1961
T. argentosigna Alexander, 1961
T. atrosetosa Alexander, 1961
T. bicolorata Alexander, 1938
T. butzi Edwards, 1928
T. costolutea Alexander, 1964
T. coulsoni Alexander, 1966
T. cramptoniana Alexander, 1966
T. crastina Alexander, 1941
T. decembris Alexander, 1949
T. dharma Alexander, 1956
T. dolichopezoides Alexander, 1920
T. dravidiana Alexander, 1961
T. durga Alexander, 1964
T. eggeriana Alexander, 1971
T. friendi Alexander, 1940
T. fuscocellula Alexander, 1961
T. halidayana Alexander, 1970
T. hennigiana Alexander, 1971
T. hermannia Alexander, 1915
T. hinayana Alexander, 1956
T. inconspicua de Meijere, 1911
T. indiscreta Alexander, 1935
T. ishidana Alexander, 1964
T. ishizuchiana Alexander, 1954
T. jacksoniana Alexander, 1956
T. kariyana Alexander, 1966
T. kiddana Alexander, 1966
T. klossi Edwards, 1916
T. lama Alexander, 1954
T. lindneriana Alexander, 1964
T. lioterga Alexander, 1961
T. magnifolia Alexander, 1948
T. medica Alexander, 1936
T. nannaris Alexander, 1961
T. nobilior Alexander, 1961
T. notomelania Alexander, 1958
T. oldhamana Alexander, 1966
T. pagastiana Alexander, 1966
T. pendleburyi Edwards, 1933
T. penicillaris Alexander, 1961
T. pokornyana Alexander, 1966
T. pumila de Meijere, 1914
T. rantaicola Alexander, 1929
T. rhombica Edwards, 1932
T. salakensis Alexander, 1915
T. schrankiana Alexander, 1971
T. scylla Alexander, 1964
T. sophista Alexander, 1949
T. sparsissima Alexander, 1928
T. sphaerostyla Alexander, 1966
T. stenorhabda Alexander, 1941
T. strictiva Alexander, 1935
T. subtenuicornis Doane, 1901
T. synchroa Alexander, 1927
T. tanyrhina Alexander, 1961
T. tonnoirana Alexander, 1968
T. turea Alexander, 1956
T. variicornis Schummel, 1833
T. venusticornis Alexander, 1964
T. verrallana Alexander, 1966
T. vitalisi Edwards, 1926
T. vocator Alexander, 1956
T. yerburyi Edwards, 1924
T. zernyi Mannheims, 1952
T. zonaria Goetghebuer, 1921

Serratipula

Subgenus Serratipula Alexander, 1965
T. cylindrata Doane, 1912
T. graminivora Alexander, 1921
T. marina Doane, 1912
T. tristis Doane, 1901

Setitipula

Subgenus Setitipula Alexander, 1965
T. esselen Alexander, 1965
T. rusticola Doane, 1912
T. trichophora Alexander, 1920

Sinotipula
Subgenus Sinotipula Alexander, 1935

T. abluta Doane, 1901
T. arjuna Alexander, 1962
T. arjunoides Alexander, 1961
T. aspersa Doane, 1912
T. assamensis Oosterbroek, 2009
T. babai Alexander, 1971
T. bodpa Edwards, 1928
T. brunettiana Alexander, 1920
T. calaveras Alexander, 1944
T. callicoma Alexander, 1966
T. catalinensis Alexander, 1950
T. chimaera Savchenko, 1969
T. coleomyia Alexander, 1965
T. commiscibilis Doane, 1912
T. cranbrooki Alexander, 1951
T. curtisiana Alexander, 1971
T. delfinadoae Alexander, 1973
T. denningi Alexander, 1969
T. differta Alexander, 1956
T. dyrope Alexander, 1961
T. emiliae Savchenko, 1964
T. exquisita Alexander, 1935
T. faustina Alexander, 1941
T. gloriosa Alexander, 1935
T. gothicana Alexander, 1943
T. gracilirostris Alexander, 1938
T. gregoryi Edwards, 1928
T. griseipennis Brunetti, 1912
T. hingstoni Edwards, 1928
T. hobsoni Edwards, 1928
T. hutchinsonae Alexander, 1936
T. hypsistos Alexander, 1962
T. janetscheki Alexander, 1968
T. jepsoni Alexander, 1945
T. josephus Alexander, 1954
T. krishna Alexander, 1962
T. lithostrota Alexander, 1961
T. macquartina Alexander, 1966
T. meigeniana Alexander, 1966
T. oenone Alexander, 1961
T. pacifica Doane, 1912
T. persplendens Alexander, 1935
T. powelli Alexander, 1965
T. rastristyla Alexander, 1945
T. rondaniana Alexander, 1970
T. sacajawea Alexander, 1945
T. savtshenkoana Alexander, 1964
T. schizorhyncha Savchenko, 1966
T. schmidiana Alexander, 1961
T. seguyana Alexander, 1964
T. shastensis Alexander, 1944
T. shennongana Yang & Yang, 1992
T. sindensis Alexander, 1935
T. staegeriana Alexander, 1971
T. strobliana Alexander, 1971
T. subcinerea Doane, 1901
T. tessellatipennis Brunetti, 1912
T. tesuque Teale, 1985
T. thibetana de Meijere, 1904
T. trilobata Edwards, 1928
T. tsiosenica Alexander, 1945
T. umbra Alexander, 1959
T. waltoni Edwards, 1928
T. wardi Edwards, 1928
T. warneri Alexander, 1944

Sivatipula

Subgenus Sivatipula Alexander, 1964
T. alhena Alexander, 1953
T. bhishma Alexander, 1964
T. biprocessa Xue and Men, 2016
T. filicornis Brunetti, 1918
T. lackschewitziana Alexander, 1928
T. mitocera Alexander, 1927
T. multidentata Men, 2018
T. parvauricula Alexander, 1941
T. pianmaensis Men, 2020
T. podenasi Men, 2020
T. pseudofilicornis Men, 2020
T. pullimargo Alexander, 1951
T. similis Men, 2016
T. suensoniana Alexander, 1940
T. tergatruncata Men, 2018
T. tongbiguanensis Men, 2016
T. yigongensis Yang, Pan and Yang, 2019

Spinitipula

Subgenus Spinitipula Alexander, 1963
T. citricornis Alexander, 1955
T. lactineipes Alexander, 1961
T. spinimarginata Alexander, 1951

Tipula

Subgenus Tipula Linnaeus, 1758
T. atlantica Mannheims, 1962
T. bicolor Loew, 1866
T. capnioneura Speiser, 1909
T. chubbi Alexander, 1956
T. consobrina Theowald, 1984
T. eumecacera Speiser, 1909
T. flagellicurta Mannheims, 1958
T. frater Alexander, 1921
T. hollanderi Theowald, 1977
T. hungarica Lackschewitz, 1930
T. italica Lackschewitz, 1930
T. kleinschmidti Mannheims, 1950
T. lobeliae Alexander, 1956
T. loeffleri Theowald, 1984
T. lourensi den Hollander, 1975
T. mediterranea Lackschewitz, 1930
T. oleracea Linnaeus, 1758
T. orientalis Lackschewitz, 1930
T. paludosa Meigen, 1830
T. plumbea Fabricius, 1781
T. soror Wiedemann, 1820
T. speiseriana Alexander, 1930
T. strigata Loew, 1866
T. subaptera Freeman, 1950
T. subcunctans Alexander, 1921
T. zimbabwensis Theowald, 1984

Tipulodinodes

Subgenus Tipulodinodes Alexander, 1965
T. lacteipes Alexander, 1943

Trichotipula
Subgenus Trichotipula Alexander, 1915

T. algonquin Alexander, 1915
T. apache Alexander, 1916
T. aplecta Alexander, 1946
T. beatula Osten Sacken, 1877
T. bituberculata Doane, 1901
T. breedlovei Alexander, 1969
T. cahuilla Alexander, 1920
T. capistrano Alexander, 1946
T. cazieri Alexander, 1942
T. cimarronensis Rogers, 1931
T. desertorum Alexander, 1946
T. dis Alexander, 1962
T. dorsolineata Doane, 1901
T. frommeri Alexander, 1973
T. furialis Alexander, 1946
T. geronimo Alexander, 1946
T. gertschi Alexander, 1963
T. guasa Alexander, 1916
T. haplotricha Alexander, 1934
T. hedgesi Alexander, 1961
T. kennedyana Alexander, 1965
T. kraussi Alexander, 1946
T. longifimbriata Alexander, 1936
T. macrophallus (Dietz, 1918)
T. malkini Alexander, 1955
T. mallophora Alexander, 1936
T. mayedai Alexander, 1946
T. megalodonta Alexander, 1946
T. mulaiki Alexander, 1948
T. oropezoides Johnson, 1909
T. pachyrhinoides Alexander, 1915
T. politonigra Alexander, 1953
T. polytricha Alexander, 1932
T. prolixa Alexander, 1947
T. puncticollis (Dietz, 1918)
T. religiosa Alexander, 1946
T. repulsa Alexander, 1943
T. retinens Alexander, 1946
T. sanctaecruzae Alexander, 1973
T. sayloriana Alexander, 1946
T. selanderi Alexander, 1956
T. stonei Alexander, 1965
T. subapache Alexander, 1947
T. unimaculata (Loew, 1864)
T. uxoria Alexander, 1946
T. vultuosa Alexander, 1946

Triplicitipula

Subgenus Triplicitipula Alexander, 1965
T. acuta Doane, 1901
T. aequalis Doane, 1901
T. barnesiana Alexander, 1963
T. bellamyi Alexander, 1965
T. colei Alexander, 1942
T. doaneiana Alexander, 1919
T. flavoumbrosa Alexander, 1918
T. hoogstraali Alexander, 1940
T. idiotricha Alexander, 1965
T. integra Alexander, 1962
T. justa Alexander, 1935
T. lygropis Alexander, 1920
T. minensis Alexander, 1936
T. nastjasta Yang & Yang, 1991
T. perlongipes Johnson, 1909
T. planicornis Doane, 1912
T. praecisa Loew, 1872
T. pubera Loew, 1864
T. quaylii Doane, 1909
T. sanctaeritae Alexander, 1946
T. silvestra Doane, 1909
T. simplex Doane, 1901
T. subtilis Doane, 1901
T. sylvicola Doane, 1912
T. triplex Walker, 1848
T. umbrosa Loew, 1863
T. variipetiolaris Alexander, 1933
T. vestigipennis Doane, 1908
T. williamsii Doane, 1909

Vestiplex
Subgenus Vestiplex Bezzi, 1924

T. acudorsata Alexander, 1970
T. adungensis Alexander, 1963
T. aestiva Savchenko, 1960
T. aldrichiana Alexander, 1929
T. alyxis Alexander, 1963
T. ambigua Savchenko, 1964
T. apicifurcata Yang & Yang, 1992
T. aptera Savchenko, 1955
T. arctica Curtis, 1835
T. arisanensis Edwards, 1921
T. auriculatalobata Starkevich, Men and Saldaitis, 2019
T. avicularia Edwards, 1928
T. avicularoides Alexander, 1936
T. balioptera Loew, 1863
T. baliopteroides Alexander, 1945
T. bergrothiana Alexander, 1918
T. bhutia Alexander, 1959
T. bicalcarata Savchenko, 1965
T. bicornigera Alexander, 1938
T. bicornuta Alexander, 1920
T. bisentis Alexander, 1951
T. biserra Edwards, 1921
T. borthi Starkevich, Men and Saldaitis, 2019
T. breviloba Men and Starkevich, 2021
T. bryceana Alexander, 1964
T. butvilai Starkevich, Saldaitis and Men, 2019
T. canadensis Loew, 1864
T. caroliniana Alexander, 1916
T. centralis Loew, 1864
T. chiswellana Alexander, 1964
T. churchillensis Alexander, 1940
T. cisalpina Riedel, 1913
T. coquillettiana Alexander, 1924
T. coronifera Savchenko, 1960
T. cremeri Alexander, 1941
T. crolina Dufour, 1992
T. czizekiana Alexander, 1970
T. dechangensis Men, Starkevich and Saldaitis, 2021
T. deserrata Alexander, 1934
T. dhalma Starkevich and Podenas, 2011
T. distifurca Alexander, 1942
T. divisotergata Alexander, 1932
T. dobrotworskyana Alexander, 1968
T. doron Alexander, 1961
T. erectiloba Alexander, 1940
T. eurydice Alexander, 1961
T. excisa Schummel, 1833
T. exechostyla Alexander, 1964
T. factiosa Alexander, 1940
T. fernandezi Theowald, 1972
T. foliacea Alexander, 1924
T. fragilicornis Riedel, 1913
T. franzi Mannheims, 1950
T. freemanana Alexander, 1963
T. fultonensis Alexander, 1918
T. gandharva Alexander, 1951
T. gedehana de Meijere, 1911
T. gongdangensis Men, Starkevich and Saldaitis, 2021
T. grahami Alexander, 1933
T. guibifida Yang & Yang, 1992
T. hadrostyla Alexander, 1970
T. halteroptera Alexander, 1951
T. hasiya Pilipenko and Starkevich, 2020
T. hemapterandra Bezzi, 1924
T. hemiptera Mannheims, 1953
T. himalayensis Brunetti, 1911
T. hirticeps Savchenko, 1960
T. hortorum Linnaeus, 1758
T. hugueniniana Alexander, 1971
T. immota Alexander, 1935
T. immsiana Alexander, 1970
T. inaequidentata Alexander, 1927
T. inaequifurca Alexander, 1949
T. inquinata Alexander, 1938
T. jakut Alexander, 1934
T. jiangi Yang & Yang, 1991
T. kamchatkana Alexander, 1934
T. kashkarovi Stackelberg, 1944
T. kiritshenkoi Savchenko, 1960
T. kosswigi Mannheims, 1953
T. kozlovi Savchenko, 1960
T. kumaonensis Alexander, 1961
T. kuwayamai Alexander, 1921
T. kwanhsienana Alexander, 1934
T. laccata Lundstrom & Frey, 1916
T. laocai Pilipenko, Starkevich and Gavryushin, 2019
T. leigongshanensis Men and Young, 2017
T. leucophaea Doane, 1901
T. leucoprocta Mik, 1889
T. longarmata Yang & Yang, 1999
T. longitudinalis Nielsen, 1929
T. longiventris Loew, 1863
T. malla Alexander, 1959
T. maoershanensis Men and Young, 2017
T. maoxianensis Starkevich, Men and Saldaitis, 2019
T. medioflava Yang & Yang, 1999
T. mediovittata Mik, 1889
T. mitchelli Edwards, 1927
T. montana Curtis, 1834
T. nestor Alexander, 1934
T. nigroapicalis Brunetti, 1911
T. nigrocostata Alexander, 1925
T. nokonis Alexander, 1928
T. nubeculosa Meigen, 1804
T. nubila Savchenko, 1960
T. opilionimorpha Savchenko, 1955
T. optanda Alexander, 1935
T. pallidicosta Pierre, 1924
T. pallitergata Alexander, 1934
T. papandajanica Edwards, 1932
T. parvapiculata Alexander, 1934
T. pauxilla Savchenko, 1960
T. perretti Alexander, 1928
T. platymera Walker, 1856
T. pleuracantha Edwards, 1928
T. proboscelongata Yang & Yang, 1991
T. quadricorna Ren, Li and Yang, 2021
T. quasimarmoratipennis Brunetti, 1912
T. rana Alexander, 1959
T. ravana Alexander, 1953
T. relicta Dia & Theowald, 1982
T. reposita Walker, 1848
T. rhimma Alexander, 1961
T. riedeliana Mannheims, 1953
T. rongtoensis Alexander, 1963
T. saccai Mannheims, 1950
T. scandens Edwards, 1928
T. schizophallus Alexander, 1973
T. schummelana Alexander, 1968
T. scripta Meigen, 1830
T. semivittata Savchenko, 1960
T. serricauda Alexander, 1914
T. serridens Alexander, 1920
T. serrulata Loew, 1864
T. setigera Savchenko, 1960
T. sexspinosa Strobl, 1898
T. siddartha Alexander, 1961
T. siebkeana Alexander, 1970
T. sintenisi Lackschewitz, 1933
T. spathacea Alexander, 1963
T. styligera Alexander, 1927
T. subapterogyne Alexander, 1920
T. subbifida Alexander, 1953
T. subcentralis Alexander, 1918
T. subscripta Edwards, 1928
T. subtestata Alexander, 1938
T. subtincta Brunetti, 1912
T. tacomicola Alexander, 1949
T. takahashiana Alexander, 1938
T. tanycera Alexander, 1961
T. tardigrada Edwards, 1928
T. tchukchi Alexander, 1934
T. teshionis Alexander, 1921
T. testata Alexander, 1935
T. theowaldana Alexander, 1964
T. tillyardana Alexander, 1970
T. tumididens Savchenko, 1988
T. tumulta Alexander, 1934
T. tuta Alexander, 1936
T. vaillanti Theowald, 1977
T. verecunda Alexander, 1924
T. virgatula Riedel, 1913
T. wahlgrenana Alexander, 1968
T. walkeriana Alexander, 1971
T. wrangeliana Stackelberg, 1944
T. xanthocephala Yang & Yang, 1991
T. xinduqiaoensis  Starkevich, Men and Saldaitis, 2019
T. xingshana Yang & Yang, 1997
T. yunnanensis Alexander, 1942
T. zayulensis Alexander, 1963
T. zhengkuni Men and Starkevich, 2021

Yamatotipula
Subgenus Yamatotipula Matsumura, 1916

T. afriberia Theowald & Oosterbroek, 1980
T. aino Alexander, 1914
T. albifrons Savchenko, 1967
T. albocaudata Doane, 1901
T. amblyostyla Savchenko, 1968
T. anceps Savchenko, 1965
T. aprilina Alexander, 1918
T. aspidoptera Alexander, 1916
T. aviceniana Savchenko, 1954
T. barbarensis Theowald & Oosterbroek, 1980
T. bhoteana Alexander, 1961
T. bitumidosa Alexander, 1971
T. brevifurcata Alexander, 1926
T. caesia Schummel, 1833
T. caloptera Loew, 1863
T. calopteroides Alexander, 1919
T. carsoni Alexander, 1963
T. catawbiana Alexander, 1940
T. caucasimontana Savchenko, 1955
T. cayuga Alexander, 1915
T. cervicula Doane, 1901
T. chonsaniana Alexander, 1945
T. cimmeria Speiser, 1909
T. coerulescens Lackschewitz, 1923
T. cognata Doane, 1901
T. colteri Alexander, 1943
T. comanche Alexander, 1916
T. concava Alexander, 1926
T. conspicua Dietz, 1917
T. continentalis Alexander, 1941
T. couckei Tonnoir, 1921
T. dejecta Walker, 1856
T. eluta Loew, 1863
T. fendleri Mannheims, 1963
T. fenestrella Theowald, 1980
T. floridensis Alexander, 1926
T. footeana Alexander, 1961
T. fraterna Loew, 1864
T. freyana Lackschewitz, 1936
T. fulvilineata Doane, 1912
T. furca Walker, 1848
T. glendenningi Alexander, 1943
T. grenfelli Alexander, 1928
T. guentheri Oosterbroek, 1994
T. hamata Savchenko, 1953
T. hexacantha Alexander, 1961
T. incana Savchenko, 1955
T. iranensis Theowald, 1978
T. iroquois Alexander, 1915
T. jacintoensis Alexander, 1946
T. jacobus Alexander, 1931
T. jamaicensis Alexander, 1928
T. jucunda Savchenko, 1961
T. kamikochiensis Alexander, 1941
T. kennicotti Alexander, 1915
T. koikei Alexander, 1971
T. lanei Alexander, 1940
T. latemarginata Alexander, 1921
T. lateralis Meigen, 1804
T. lionota Holmgren, 1883
T. lucifera Savchenko, 1954
T. ludoviciana Alexander, 1919
T. machidai Alexander, 1933
T. maculipleura Alexander, 1927
T. manahatta Alexander, 1919
T. marginella Theowald, 1980
T. meridiana Doane, 1912
T. misakana Alexander, 1953
T. moesta Riedel, 1919
T. montium Egger, 1863
T. nephophila Alexander, 1940
T. nigrolamina Alexander, 1950
T. nocticostata Alexander, 1971
T. nova Walker, 1848
T. noveboracensis Alexander, 1919
T. nuntia Alexander, 1946
T. ompoensis Alexander, 1945
T. osceola Alexander, 1927
T. patagiata Alexander, 1924
T. pierrei Tonnoir, 1921
T. poliocephala Alexander, 1922
T. protrusa Alexander, 1934
T. pruinosa Wiedemann, 1817
T. quadrivittata Staeger, 1840
T. recticauda Savchenko, 1953
T. reversa Alexander, 1956
T. riedeli Mannheims, 1952
T. roya Dufour, 2003
T. sackeniana Alexander, 1918
T. sayi Alexander, 1911
T. sempiterna Alexander, 1933
T. setosipennis Alexander, 1920
T. shevtshenkoi Savchenko, 1954
T. solitaria Savchenko, 1953
T. spernax Osten Sacken, 1877
T. strepens Loew, 1863
T. subeluta Johnson, 1913
T. subincana Savchenko, 1961
T. submontium Theowald & Oosterbroek, 1981
T. subnova Alexander, 1937
T. subprotrusa Savchenko, 1955
T. subreversa Alexander, 1956
T. subvirgo Alexander, 1951
T. succincta Alexander, 1940
T. sulphurea Doane, 1901
T. tenebrosa Coquillett, 1900
T. tenuilinea Alexander, 1959
T. tephrocephala Loew, 1864
T. tricolor Fabricius, 1775
T. tsurugiana Alexander, 1953
T. vicina Dietz, 1917
T. virgo Osten Sacken, 1886
T. xanthostigma Dietz, 1917
T. yamamuriana Alexander, 1926

Unplaced

T. baileyi Alexander, 1953
T. bipendula Alexander, 1934
T. bispathifera Savchenko, 1960
T. cladomera Alexander, 1936
T. compressiloba Alexander, 1938
T. coxitalis Alexander, 1935
T. demeijerei Edwards, 1915
T. depressiloba Oosterbroek & Theowald, 1992
T. flavicosta Alexander, 1915
T. formosicola Alexander, 1920
T. frigida Walker, 1848
T. gressitti Alexander, 1935
T. idiopyga Alexander, 1949
T. imanoensis Alexander, 1954
T. incisurata Alexander, 1940
T. inordinans Walker, 1859
T. johanseni Alexander, 1919
T. kusunokiana Alexander, 1955
T. lanio Alexander, 1945
T. liui Alexander, 1941
T. maculatipennis Say, 1824
T. melanonotalis Alexander, 1954
T. microcellula Alexander, 1923
T. nippoalpina Alexander, 1931
T. opinata Alexander, 1940
T. otiosa Alexander, 1924
T. palesoides Alexander, 1942
T. percommoda Alexander, 1938
T. perelegans Alexander, 1921
T. perlata Alexander, 1938
T. pluriguttata Alexander, 1920
T. praeses Alexander, 1942
T. prolongata Alexander, 1936
T. puncticornis Macquart, 1850
T. repugnans Alexander, 1940
T. reservata Alexander, 1941
T. sexlobata Alexander, 1938
T. spectata Alexander, 1940
T. sternosetosa Alexander, 1940
T. sternotuberculata Alexander, 1935
T. strix Alexander, 1918
T. subdepressa Alexander, 1941
T. subnata Alexander, 1949
T. subpolaris Alexander, 1919
T. subyusou Alexander, 1929
T. superciliosa Alexander, 1924
T. tantula Alexander, 1924
T. terebrata Edwards, 1921
T. trimaculata (Emmons, 1854)
T. tropica de Meijere, 1913
T. varaha Alexander, 1953
T. xanthomelaena Edwards, 1926
T. yanoana Alexander, 1953
T. yusou Alexander, 1914
T. yusouoides Alexander, 1929

References

 List
Lists of insect species